Unnur Brá Konráðsdóttir (born 6 April 1974) was the Speaker of the Althing from the 24th of January 2017 until she failed to be re-elected in the 2017 Icelandic parliamentary election. She has also served as the chair of the Parliament's Judicial Affairs and Education Committee.

External links 
 Biography of Unnur Brá Konráðsdóttir on the parliament website (Icelandic)

References

Living people
1974 births
Unnur Bra Konradsdottir
21st-century Icelandic politicians
Unnur Bra Konradsdottir
Unnur Bra Konradsdottir
Unnur Bra Konradsdottir
Unnur Bra Konradsdottir
Unnur Bra Konradsdottir
21st-century Icelandic lawyers